The Bradley Beach School District is a community public school district that serves students in pre-kindergarten through eighth grade from Bradley Beach in Monmouth County, New Jersey, United States.

As of the 2020–21 school year, the district, comprised of one school, had an enrollment of 263 students and 37.8 classroom teachers (on an FTE basis), for a student–teacher ratio of 7.0:1.

The district is classified by the New Jersey Department of Education as being in District Factor Group "CD", the sixth-highest of eight groupings. District Factor Groups organize districts statewide to allow comparison by common socioeconomic characteristics of the local districts. From lowest socioeconomic status to highest, the categories are A, B, CD, DE, FG, GH, I and J.

For public school students in ninth through twelfth grades, the school district maintains sending/receiving relationships with the Asbury Park Public Schools and Neptune Township Schools under which the overwhelming majority of Bradley Beach students are sent to Asbury Park High School and the other 7% are sent to Neptune High School. As of the 2020–21 school year, Asbury Park High School had an enrollment of 682 students and 54.5 classroom teachers (on an FTE basis), for a student–teacher ratio of 12.5:1 and Neptune High School had an enrollment of 1,270 students and 115.0 classroom teachers (on an FTE basis), for a student–teacher ratio of 11.0:1.

An application program with Red Bank Regional High School or the schools in the Monmouth County Vocational School District are alternatives available for students from the borough attending public high school.

School
Bradley Beach Elementary School served an enrollment of 317 students in the 2020–21 school year. The professional teaching staff includes 40 certified teachers and six paraprofessionals.

Administration
Core members of the district's administration are:
Michael Heidelberg, Principal / Superintendent
David Tonzola, Business Administrator / Board Secretary

Board of education
The district's board of education is comprised of nine members who set policy and oversee the fiscal and educational operation of the district through its administration. As a Type II school district, the board's trustees are elected directly by voters to serve three-year terms of office on a staggered basis, with three seats up for election each year held (since 2012) as part of the November general election. The board appoints a superintendent to oversee the district's day-to-day operations and a business administrator to supervise the business functions of the district.

References

External links
Bradley Beach School District

School Data for the Bradley Beach School District, National Center for Education Statistics

Bradley Beach, New Jersey
New Jersey District Factor Group CD
School districts in Monmouth County, New Jersey
Public K–8 schools in New Jersey